The 2021 Copa Sudamericana first stage was played from 16 March to 14 April 2021. A total of 32 teams competed in the first stage to decide 16 of the 32 places in the group stage of the 2021 Copa Sudamericana.

Draw

The draw for the first stage was held on 5 February 2021, 12:00 PYST (UTC−3), at the CONMEBOL Convention Centre in Luque, Paraguay. For the first stage, the 32 teams involved were divided into eight pots according to their national association.

The 32 teams were drawn into 16 ties, with the four teams from each national association drawn against each other into two ties per association (e.g., the four teams from Bolivia were drawn into ties BOL 1 and BOL 2), and the first team drawn in each tie hosting the second leg.

Notes

Format

In the first stage, each tie was played on a home-and-away two-legged basis. If tied on aggregate, the away goals rule was used. If still tied, extra time will not be played, and a penalty shoot-out would be used to determine the winner (Regulations Article 2.4.2).

The 16 winners of the first stage advanced to the group stage to join the 12 teams directly qualified for that stage (six from Argentina and six from Brazil), and four teams transferred from the Copa Libertadores (the four teams eliminated in the third stage of qualifying).

Matches
The first legs were played on 16–18 March, 6 and 7 April while the second legs were played on 6–8, 13 and 14 April 2021.

|}

Match BOL 1

Guabirá won 6–2 on aggregate and advanced to the group stage (BOL 1).

Match BOL 2

Jorge Wilstermann won 4–2 on aggregate and advanced to the group stage (BOL 2).

Match CHI 1

Huachipato won 4–0 on aggregate and advanced to the group stage (CHI 1).

Match CHI 2

Palestino won 2–1 on aggregate and advanced to the group stage (CHI 2).

Match COL 1

Deportes Tolima won 3–0 on aggregate and advanced to the group stage (COL 1).

Match COL 2

La Equidad won 3–2 on aggregate and advanced to the group stage (COL 2).

Match ECU 1

Emelec won 4–2 on aggregate and advanced to the group stage (ECU 1).

Match ECU 2

Aucas won 5–1 on aggregate and advanced to the group stage (ECU 2).

Match PAR 1

Tied 0–0 on aggregate, 12 de Octubre won on penalties and advanced to the group stage (PAR 1).

Match PAR 2

River Plate won 6–3 on aggregate and advanced to the group stage (PAR 2).

Match PER 1

Sport Huancayo won 5–0 on aggregate and advanced to the group stage (PER 1).

Match PER 2

Melgar won 5–3 on aggregate and advanced to the group stage (PER 2).

Match URU 1

Montevideo City Torque won 2–0 on aggregate and advanced to the group stage (URU 1).

Match URU 2

Peñarol won 6–3 on aggregate and advanced to the group stage (URU 2).

Match VEN 1

Metropolitanos won 3–0 on aggregate and advanced to the group stage (VEN 1).

Match VEN 2

Tied 2–2 on aggregate, Aragua won on away goals and advanced to the group stage (VEN 2).

Notes

References

External links
CONMEBOL Sudamericana 2021, CONMEBOL.com

1
March 2021 sports events in South America
April 2021 sports events in South America